The name Nishat or Nishad is a baby Boy and Girl name. It is an Arabic and Persian Name. Most of the time it is used for a Girl. In persian its meaning derives from 'bringer of happiness'.

Boy
The meaning of nishat in the Gender Boy is Mirth, Kashir, Ecstasy.

Girl
The meaning of nishat in Gender Girl is  Happiness, intoxication.

Places

 Nishat Bagh  Nishat Bagh (Urdu: نشات باغ, is a terraced Mughal garden built on the eastern side of the Dal Lake, close to Srinagar in the state of Jammu and Kashmir, India. It is the second largest Mughal garden in the Kashmir Valley. The largest in area is the Shalimar Bagh, which is also located on the bank of the Dal Lake. ‘Nishat Bagh’ is Urdu, which means "Garden of Joy," "Garden of Gladness" and "Garden of Delight.
 Nishatpura railway station   Bhopal Nishatpura (Station Code : NST) is a terminal railway station of Bhopal City, the capital of Madhya Pradesh. It is operated by West Central Railway.
 Nishatabad railway station   Nishatabad railway station (Urdu: نشاط آباد ریلوے اسٹیشن ) is located in Pakistan.
Nishat-u-Sania  Nishat-u-Sania Model School is a school in Kot Momin in Punjab, Pakistan. There are fifty teachers and eight hundred students in Nishat-u-Sania, and it was established in 2006. Kot Moman is a Tahsil of Sargodha in Pakistan.

People

 Nishat Group   Mian Muhammad Mansha (Urdu: میاں محمد منشاء) is a prominent Pakistani industrialist and entrepreneur who is officially the 3rd richest man in the country. According to Forbes listings in 2010, he was the 937th richest person in the world. He is the chairman and CEO of the Nishat Group.
Nishat Khan   Nishat Khan is an Indian sitar player, composer and son of surbahar player Imrat Khan.

Arabic given names